The Palace of Justice siege was a 1985 attack on the Supreme Court of Colombia, in which members of the leftist M-19 guerrilla group took over the Palace of Justice in Bogotá and held the Supreme Court hostage, intending to hold a trial against President Belisario Betancur. The guerrilla group called themselves the "Iván Marino Ospina Company" after an M-19 commander who had been killed by the Colombian military on 28 August 1985. Hours later, after a military raid, the incident left almost half of the twenty-five Supreme Court Justices dead.

Background
Drug dealers had issued death threats against the Supreme Court Justices since 1985, with the intention of forcing them to rule out the Extradition Treaty with the United States.

Siege

Day one: 6 November
On 6 November 1985, at 11:35 a.m., three vehicles holding 35 guerrillas (25 men and 10 women) stormed the Palace of Justice of Colombia, entering through the basement. Meanwhile, another group of guerrillas disguised as civilians took over the first floor and the main entrance. The guerrillas killed security guards Eulogio Blanco and Gerardo Díaz Arbeláez and building manager Jorge Tadeo Mayo Castro.

Jorge Medina, a witness located in the basement at the start of the siege, said that "suddenly, the guerrillas entered the basement in a truck. They opened fire with their machine guns against everyone who was there". The official report judged that the guerrillas planned the takeover operation to be a 'bloody takeover'. According to these official sources the guerrillas "set out to shoot indiscriminately and detonate building-shaking bombs while chanting M19-praising battle cries."

The M-19 lost one guerrilla and a nurse during the initial raid on the building. After the guerrillas had neutralised the security personnel guarding the building, they installed armed posts at strategic places, such as the stairs and the fourth floor. A group of guerrillas led by Commander Luis Otero got to the fourth floor and kidnapped the President of the Supreme Court, Chief Justice Alfonso Reyes Echandía.

In the meantime many hostages took refuge in empty offices on the first floor, where they hid until around 2 pm.

The assailants took 300 people hostage, including the 24 justices and 20 other judges. The first hostage the guerrilla group asked for was the Supreme Court Justice and President of the Constitutional Court, then called Sala Constitucional, Manuel Gaona Cruz, who was in charge of delivering the opinion of the court with regard to the constitutionality of the extradition treaty between Colombia and the United States.

About three hours after the initial seizure, army troops rescued about 200 hostages from the lower three floors of the building; the surviving gunmen and remaining hostages occupied the upper two floors.

A recording was delivered to a radio station soon after the seizure, saying that the M-19 group had taken over the building "in the name of peace and social justice". From the Supreme Court, the M-19 members demanded via telephone that President Belisario Betancur come to the Palace of Justice in order to stand trial and negotiate. The president refused and ordered an emergency cabinet session.

Day two: 7 November 
The M-19 rebels freed State Councillor Reynaldo Arciniegas at 8:30am, with a message for the government to allow the entry of the Red Cross and initiate dialogue. However, the assault on the Palace of Justice commenced later that morning.

Assault
The operation to retake the building was led by General Jesús Armando Arias Cabrales, commander of the Thirteenth Army Brigade in Bogotá; he appointed Colonel Alfonso Plazas, commander of an armored cavalry battalion, to personally oversee the operation. The retaking of the building began that day and ended on 7 November, when Army troops stormed the Palace of Justice, after having occupied some of the lower floors during the first day of the siege. After surrounding the building with EE-9 Cascavel armored cars and soldiers with automatic weapons, they stormed the building sometime after 2 pm. The EE-9s knocked down the building's massive doorway, and even made some direct hits against the structure's external walls.

The results of the tests carried out later by ballistics experts and investigators demonstrated that the most likely cause of the burning criminal records, containing proof and warrants against many criminals, was the recoil effect of the army's rockets and not part of M-19's actions. Tests proved that if fired by a soldier standing within twenty feet of wood-lined walls of the library that housed Colombian legal archives, the intense heat generated by the rocket's rear blast could have ignited the wooden paneling. In any event, in a shelved area stacked high with old papers, files, books, and newspapers, the quantity of explosives used by the military virtually guaranteed a conflagration." In total, over 6000 different documents were burned. The fire lasted about 2 days, even with efforts from firemen to try to smother the flames. An investigated theory to the "disappearance" of the missing entities in the siege is that they were charred in the fire, and were not able to be identified in any way, and without having been found, these entities are regarded as missing in action. This theory is still being studied in the different trials of the case.

98 people died during the assault on the Palace. Those killed consisted of hostages, soldiers, and guerrillas, including their leader, Andrés Almarales, and four other senior commanders of M-19. After the raid, another Supreme Court justice died in a hospital after suffering a heart attack.

Aftermath
The siege of the Palace of Justice and the subsequent raid was one of the deadliest attacks in Colombia in its war with leftist rebels. The M-19 group was still a potent force after the raid, but was severely hampered by the deaths of five of its leaders. In March 1990, it signed a peace treaty with the government.

After the siege, firemen rushed to the site of the assault and smothered the few flames left in the palace. Other rescue groups assisted with removing debris and rubble left after the siege.

President Betancur went on national TV on the night of the 7th, saying he took full responsibility for the "terrible nightmare"; He offered condolences to the families of those who died, civilians and rebels, and said he would continue to look for a peaceful solution with the rebels. Exactly a week later, on 14 November, he would offer condolences for another tragedy: the eruption of the Nevado del Ruiz volcano, which killed 25,000 people in the Armero tragedy. "We have had one national tragedy after another", he said.

This siege led to the creation of the AFEUR unit within the Colombian Army to manage this kind of situation. Colombia's Armed Forces did not have antiterrorist units specifically trained for urban operations before the siege, and some partially blamed the outcome on the relative inexperience of the personnel assigned to the task.

Dead magistrates
The twelve magistrates killed were:
 Manuel Gaona Cruz
 Alfonso Reyes Echandía
 Fabio Calderón Botero
 Dario Velásquez Gaviria
 Eduardo Gnecco Correa
 Carlos Medellín Forero
 Ricardo Medina Moyano
 Alfonso Patiño Rosselli
 Horacio Montoya Gil
 Pedro Elías Serrano Abadía
Fanny González Franco
 Dante Luis Fiorillo Porras (died of a heart attack)

Alleged drug cartel links

Shortly after the siege, the U.S. and Colombian Justice Minister Enrique Parejo asserted that drug traffickers financed the operation in order to get rid of various criminal files that were lost during the event, hoping to avoid extradition. The Special Commission of Inquiry, established by the Betancur government after intense public pressure, released a June 1986 report which concluded that this was not the case.

Author Ana Carrigan, who quoted the June 1986 report in her book on the siege and originally dismissed any such links between the M-19 and the Medellín Cartel, told Cromos magazine in late 2005 that she now believes that the Cartel may have financially supported the M-19.

Pablo Escobar's son claimed that while his father did not come up with or plan the raid, he did pay M-19 a million dollars. Escobar said that he supported M-19 because he "believed in the ideals" of M-19 and "looked for ways to preserve and support them".

On the same day of the siege, the Supreme Court's docket apparently called for the beginning of pending deliberations on the constitutionality of the Colombia-United States extradition treaty. The M-19 was publicly opposed to extradition on nationalist grounds. Several of the magistrates had been previously threatened by drug lords in order to prevent any possibility of a positive decision on the treaty. One year after the siege, the treaty was declared unconstitutional.

Former Assistant to the Colombian Attorney General, National Deputy Comptroller, author and renowned Professor Jose Mauricio Gaona (son of murdered Supreme Court magistrate ) along with the former Minister of Justice and Ambassador of Colombia to the United Kingdom, Carlos Medellín Becerra (son of magistrate ), have consistently pushed for further and broader lines of investigations related not only to the presumed links between the M-19 and the Medellín Cartel drug lords, but also to any other possible links to the investigations performed by the Justices of members of the Armed Forces. Congressman Gustavo Petro, a former M-19 guerrilla, has denied these accusations and dismissed them as based upon the inconsistent testimonies of drug lords. Petro says that the surviving members of the M-19 do admit to their share of responsibility for the tragic events of the siege, on behalf of the entire organization, but deny any links to the drug trade.

Impunity
Later investigations and commentators have considered both the M-19 and the military as responsible for the deaths of the justices and civilians inside the building. Some have blamed President Belisario Betancur for not taking the necessary actions or for failing to negotiate, and others have commented on the possibility of a sort of de facto "24-hour coup", during which the military was in control of the situation.

According to Ana Carrigan's 1993 book The Palace of Justice: A Colombian Tragedy, Supreme Court Chief Justice Alfonso Reyes was apparently burned alive during the assault, as someone incinerated his body after pouring gasoline over it. The book also asserts that, after the siege was over, some twenty-eight bodies were dumped into a mass grave and apparently soaked with acid, in order to make identification difficult. Carrigan argued that the bodies of the victims of the Nevado del Ruiz volcano eruption, which buried the city of Armero and killed more than 20,000 people, were dumped into the same mass grave, making any further forensic investigations impractical.

Despite numerous investigations and lawsuits to date, impunity prevailed for most of the subsequent decades. Ana Carrigan asserted in her 1993 book that "Colombia has moved on... Colombia has forgotten the Palace of Justice siege", in much the same way that, in her opinion, Colombians have also forgotten or adopted a position of denial towards other tragic events, such as the 1928 Santa Marta Massacre. No definite responsibility has been fixed on the government or on the surviving members of the M-19 movement who were pardoned after they demobilized.

Eduardo Umaña, the first attorney representing some of the families of the people killed during the siege, was assassinated in 1998, and several members of those families had to flee to Europe because of death threats against them.

The missing

At least 11 people disappeared during the events of the siege, most of them cafeteria workers, the fate of ten of them unknown. It is likely that their remains may be among a number of unidentified and charred bodies, one of which was identified through DNA testing done by the National University of Colombia, leaving the fates of the other 10 still in question.

According to Ana Carrigan, Irma Franco, a law student and M-19 guerrilla, disappeared after she was captured. Carrigan states that Franco was seen in the custody of Colombian special forces by several hostages. She also states that the guerrilla left with several hostages and was never seen again. The Special Commission of Inquiry confirmed Franco's disappearance, and the judges requested that the investigation of her case be thoroughly pursued.

One week after the siege, M-19 released a communique to the press claiming that six leaders, including Franco, and "seven other fighters" had all been "disappeared and murdered" by the army. From the tapes of the military and police inter-communications it is known that army intelligence arrested at least seventeen people in the course of the two-day siege. None of the M-19 leaders, with the exception of Andrés Almarales, were ever identified in the city morgue.

Later developments

The events surrounding the Palace of Justice siege received renewed media coverage in Colombia during the 20th anniversary of the tragedy. Among other outlets, the country's main daily El Tiempo, the weekly El Espectador, and the Cromos magazine published several articles, interviews and opinion pieces on the matter, including stories about the survivors, as well as the plight of the victims' relatives and those of the missing.

2005–2006 Truth Commission

The Supreme Court created a Truth Commission in order to investigate the siege. The Commission officially began its work on November 3, 2005.

2006–2007 Judicial processes
On 22 August 2006, Attorney General Mario Iguarán announced that former Colonel Edilberto Sánchez, former B-2 intelligence chief of the Army's Thirteenth Brigade, would be summoned for questioning and investigated for the crimes of kidnapping and forced disappearance. Public prosecutors are to reopen the case after examining video tape recordings and identifying cafeteria manager Carlos Augusto Rodríguez being taken outside of the Palace of Justice alive by a soldier, together with other former M-19 hostages.

Former Col. Sánchez was then detained. In May 2007, former Col. Sánchez has been questioned by prosecutors about his possible role in the disappearance of Irma Franco and at least two cafeteria workers, who would have left the Palace alive. Sánchez rejected the charges and proclaimed his innocence. He accepted that he could have received the order to cover the exit of some hostages from the Palace of Justice.

2008 Virginia Vallejo's testimony
On 11 July 2008, Virginia Vallejo, the television anchorwoman who was romantically involved with Pablo Escobar from 1983 to 1987 and author of "Amando a Pablo, odiando a Escobar" (2007) (Loving Pablo, Hating Escobar), was asked to testify in the reopened case of the siege of the Palace of Justice, in order to confirm events that she had described in her memoir, in the chapter "That Palace in Flames", in pages 230 to 266. In the Colombian Consulate in Miami, under oath, she described the relationship of the drug lord with the Sandinista Government of Nicaragua and the M-19; also, a meeting of Escobar with the rebel commander Ivan Marino Ospina, in which she had been present, two weeks before the latter was killed by the Army, on August 28, 1985. In her judicial declaration, Vallejo confirmed how, in mid-1986, Escobar had told her that he had paid one million dollars in cash to the rebels, and another million in arms and explosives to steal his files from the Palace of Justice, before the Supreme Court began studying the extradition of the leading members of the cocaine cartels to the United States. During her testimony, that lasted five hours, the journalist described also photographs of sixteen bodies that she had received anonymously in that year. According to her, Escobar identified the victims as the employees of the cafeteria of the Palace and two rebel women that had been detained by the Army after the siege, and had been tortured and disappeared on orders of colonel Edilberto Sánchez, director of B-2, Military Intelligence. Though her testimony was protected under gag, several excerpts appeared on 17 August 2008 in El Tiempo, the newspaper of the Santos' family, including the vice president Francisco Santos, and defense minister Juan Manuel Santos. On radio stations, Vallejo accused the office of the Colombian Attorney General of filtering it to the media and adulterating the contents, to protect the military and the former presidential candidate Alberto Santofimio, Escobar's political ally. On 3 June 2010, Virginia Vallejo was granted political asylum in the United States of America.

Sentence and Absolution of Colonel Plazas Vega
In 2010, retired Colonel Alfonso Plazas Vega was sentenced to 30 years imprisonment for his alleged role in forced disappearances after the siege.

The President of Colombia, Álvaro Uribe, reacted by declaring that he was "sad and hurt" by the decision. He announced his intention of seeking changes to the way military are judged in Colombia and asked for prison sentences for those he called the "instigators" of the massacre. Uribe also had a meeting with the military command to find ways to protect them from "judiciary decisions that interfere with their work".

Nevertheless, Colombia's General Attorney has declared that crimes against humanity took place during the siege, which has allowed for the continued processing of another colonel and one general involved in the incident. María Stella Jara, the judge that handed the sentence to Colonel Plazas left the country after receiving multiple death threats to her and her son. She and her family had to live under heavy surveillance for the duration of the trial.

On 16 December 2015 Colonel Plazas Vega was declared innocent in a five to three vote by the Colombian Supreme Court and absolved of his previous 30-year prison sentence. The declaration was influenced by a revisiting of the case in the Supreme Court when the validity of testimonies of four witnesses came into question, along with absence of conclusive evidence to prove guilty in the charges brought again Plazas Vega.

See also 

 List of attacks on high courts

References

Further reading

Books

Government/NGO reports
State Department Cable says Colombian Army Responsible for Palace of Justice Deaths, Disappearances, National Security Archive Electronic Briefing Book No. 289, National Security Archive, October 28, 2009
Landmark Conviction in Colombia's Palace of Justice Case, National Security Archive Electronic Briefing Book No. 319, National Security Archive, June 11, 2010

News

Impunity Still Surrounds Palace of Justice Tragedy, Inter Press Service

Colombian conflict
Hostage taking in Colombia
Mass murder in 1985
Massacres in Colombia
Terrorist incidents in South America in 1985
19th of April Movement
1985 in Colombia
Supreme Court of Justice of Colombia
Urban warfare
20th century in Bogotá
1985 murders in Colombia
Terrorist incidents in Colombia in the 1980s
Attacks on government buildings and structures
Events in Bogotá